Frank Alpe (26 March 1884 – 10 March 1958) was a New Zealand cricketer. He played in one first-class match for Wellington in 1908/09.

See also
 List of Wellington representative cricketers

References

External links
 

1884 births
1958 deaths
New Zealand cricketers
Wellington cricketers
Cricketers from Wellington City